Mark Parkinson may refer to:

Mark Parkinson (Kansas politician), former Governor of Kansas
Mark Parkinson (Missouri politician), Missouri state representative